This is a list of Thai people, persons from Thailand or of Thai descent, who are notable.

Businesspeople

 Bhurit Bhirombhakdi — chief executive in the Singha Corporation
 Dhanin Chearavanont — Senior Chairman of CP Group
Marc Faber (born 1946) - investment analyst and entrepreneur
 William Heinecke — CEO and Chairman of Minor International
 Keeree Kanjanapas — founder and CEO of Bangkok Mass Transit System PCL (BTSC) (BTS Skytrain)
 Nualphan Lamsam — President and Chief Executive Officer of Muang Thai Life Assurance, Chairwoman of Port Football Club and general manager of the Thailand women's national football team
 Harald Link — chairman, CEO, and owner of B.Grimm
 Krit Ratanarak — chairman of Bangkok Broadcasting & Television Company
 Prasert Prasarttong-Osoth — founder and owner of Bangkok Dusit Medical Services and the owner of Bangkok Airways
 Nishita Shah — managing director of GP Group
 Charoen Sirivadhanabhakdi — founder of Thai Beverage, the chairman of conglomerate TCC Group and Fraser and Neave
 Chin Sophonpanich — founder of Bangkok Bank and Bangkok Insurance
 Vichai Srivaddhanaprabha — founder and chairman of King Power and the owner of Premier League football club Leicester City from 2010 to 2018
 William Alfred Tilleke — founder of Tilleke & Gibbins
 Chaleo Yoovidhya — originator of Krating Daeng and co-creator of the Red Bull

Law
 Kanakorn Pianchana — judge who attempted suicide in court

Monarchs
 King Rama I — King of Siam 1737-1809
 King Rama II — King of Siam 1809-1824
 King Rama III — King of Siam 1824-1851
 King Rama IV — King of Siam 1851-1868
 King Rama V — King of Siam 1868-1910
 Queen Sri Bajarindra — Queen of Siam 1897-1910
 King Rama VI — King of Siam 1910-1925
 King Rama VII — King of Siam 1925-1935
 Queen Rambai Barni — Queen of Siam 1925-1935
 King Ananda Mahidol — King of Thailand 1910-1925
 King Bhumibol Adulyadej — King of Thailand 1946-2016
 Queen Sirikit – Queen of Thailand 1950-2016
 Princess Ubol Ratana — eldest child of King Bhumibol Adulyadej
 King Vajiralongkorn — King of Thailand 2016–present
 Queen Suthida — Queen of Thailand 2019–present
 Princess Sirindhorn — second daughter of King Bhumibol Adulyadej
 Princess Chulabhorn — youngest daughter of King Bhumibol Adulyadej
 Princess Soamsawali — member of the Thai royal family
 Princess Bajrakitiyabha — first grandchild of King Bhumibol Adulyadej
 Princess Sirivannavari — daughter of King Vajiralongkorn, fashion designer, and equestrian 
 Ploypailin Mahidol Jensen — granddaughter of King Bhumibol Adulyadej
 Poom Jensen — grandson of King Bhumibol Adulyadej
 Sirikitiya Jensen — granddaughter of King Bhumibol Adulyadej

Government & Politics

 Devawongse Varoprakar – second Minister of Foreign Affairs of Siam; 1885-1923
 Phraya Manopakorn Nititada – first Prime Minister of Siam
 Seni Pramoj – Prime Minister of Thailand; from 17 September 1945 to 31 January 1946, 15 February 1975 to 13 March 1975, and 20 April 1976 to 6 October 1976
 Pridi Phanomyong – Prime Minister of Thailand from 24 March 1946 to 23 August 1946 and professor
 Kukrit Pramoj – Prime Minister of Thailand from 14 March 1975 to 20 April 1976
 Prem Tinsulanonda – Prime Minister of Thailand from 3 March 1980 to 4 August 1988
 Chuan Leekpai – Prime Minister of Thailand from 20 September 1992 to 19 May 1995 and from 9 November 1997 to 9 February 2001
 Thaksin Shinawatra – Prime Minister of Thailand from 9 February 2001 to 19 September 2006
 Samak Sundaravej – Prime Minister of Thailand from 29 January 2008 to 9 September 2008
 Abhisit Vejjajiva – Prime Minister of Thailand from 17 December 2008 to 5 August 2011
 Yingluck Shinawatra – first female Prime Minister of Thailand from 5 August 2011 to 7 May 2014
 Prayut Chan-o-cha – Prime Minister of Thailand since 22 May 2014
 Chirayu Isarangkul – Director-General of the Crown Property Bureau and a former Deputy Minister of Industry of Thailand
 Chuwit Kamolvisit – politician, one time massage parlor owner
 Kraisak Choonhavan – politician and member of the Senate from 2000 till 2006
 Piyasvasti Amranand – Energy Minister between 9 October 2006 and 6 February 2008
 Pongpol Adireksarn – politician of the Thai Rak Thai party
 Pridiyathorn Devakula – Member of Cabinet and had served as Governor of the Bank of Thailand
 Somkid Jatusripitak – politician, former Deputy Prime Minister and Minister of Commerce of Thailand
 Sunata Kangvalkulkij – Thailand's ambassador to the United Nations
 Sudarat Keyuraphan – politician, served as the Minister of Agriculture and Cooperatives
 Sunthorn Kongsompong – military coup d'état leader, deposed the government from 1991 to 1992
 Thanong Bidaya – politician and deposed Finance Minister
 Prachai Leophai-ratana – former Senator and a businessman 
 Prommin Lertsuridej – politician, Secretary General, Deputy Prime Minister in charge of economic affairs, and Minister of Energy
 Thammarak Isaragura na Ayuthaya – military officer, Member of Parliament, and former Defence Minister
 Pallop Pinmanee – Army general who took part in several coups, 
 Sukhumbhand Paribatra – politician and Member of Parliament
 Noppadon Pattama – politician, Foreign Minister of Thailand 2008
 Ratsadanupradit Mahison Phakdi – provincial administrator, introduced the rubber tree to Thailand
 Sang Phathanothai – politician, union leader, and journalist
 Nit Phibunsongkhram – career diplomat and politician
 Lek Nana – businessman and politician, Deputy Foreign Minister, Minister of Science, Technology, and Energy
 Mongkol Na Songkhla – politician, Minister of Health
 Surin Pitsuwan – politician
 Sutham Sangprathum – politician
 Thaworn Senniam – politician current Deputy Interior Minister
 Boonsanong Punyodyana – politician
 Boonchu Rojanastien – banker, finance minister 1975 and 1976 
 Manoonkrit Roopkachorn – former Thai military officer, Senator and Speaker of the Senate
 Karoon Sai-ngam – politician, former Senator of the Kingdom of Thailand
 Chatumongol Sonakul – former Governor of the Bank of Thailand, 1998 to 2001
 Prasong Soonsiri – pilot, politician, Foreign Minister, and head of the National Security Council
 Chamlong Srimuang – activist, former politician, former General
 Wijit Srisa-arn – politician, appointed Minister of Education, 2006
 Chalongphob Sussangkarn – President of the Thailand Development Research Institute, Minister of Finance 
 Santi Thakral – President of the Supreme Court, Privy Council 
 Puey Ungpakorn – Governor of the (Central) Bank of Thailand, Dean of the Faculty of Economics, rector of Thammasat University
 Prateep Ungsongtham Hata – activist, former Senator
 Borwornsak Uwanno – Cabinet secretary-general, professor of Law, drafter of the 1997 Constitution
 Mechai Viravaidya – former politician and activist
 Sanguan Tularaksa – politician and a leading member of Seri Thai
 Chitchai Wannasathit – caretaker prime minister of Thailand from April to May 2006
 Kowit Wattana – Police Commissioner-General 2004–2007
 Luang Wichitwathakan – politician, playwright and historian
 Tammy Duckworth – U.S. Senator from Illinois
 Mechai Viravaidya – politician and activist

Television, Film & Music

 Akara Amarttayakul – actor
 Alexander Rendell – actor and singer
 Amara Asavananda – actress and beauty pageant titleholder
 Amphol Lampoon – actor and singer
 Anan Anwar – singer
 Ananda Everingham – actor and model
 Andrea Suárez – singer
 Ann Thongprasom – actress, producer, and TV host
 Apasiri Nitibhon – actress and model
 Apichatpong Weerasethakul – film director, Palme d'Or winner
 Aranya Namwong – actress
 Araya A. Hargate – actress, model, and TV host
 Areeya Chumsai – model, teacher, and filmmaker
 BamBam – Korean pop singer, member of boy group Got7
 Billy Ogan – actor, singer, TV host, writer, and composer
 Bongkoj Khongmalai – actress
 Brenda Song - actress
 Carissa Springett – actress and model
 Caroline Desneiges – actress and businesswoman
 Chakrit Yamnam – actor
 Chalida Vijitvongthong – actress and model
 Chalita Suansane – model, actress, and beauty pageant titleholder
 Chanon Santinatornkul – actor
 Charlie Trairat – actor and singer
 Charm Osathanond – actress, model, TV host, and beauty pageant titleholder
 Chartchai Ngamsan – actor
 Chatchai Plengpanich – actor
 Chattapong Pantana-Angkul – actor and martial artist
 Cherprang Areekul – member of the Thai girl group BNK48
 Chinawut Indracusin – singer
 Chintara Sukapatana – actress
 Chonlathorn Kongyingyong – actor and singer
 Chrissy Teigen – model and author
 Christina Aguilar – pop singer
 Christy Gibson – singer
 Cindy Burbridge – model, actress, TV host, and beauty pageant titleholder
 Cris Horwang – actress, model, singer, TV host, and DJ
 Davika Hoorne – actress and model
 Daweerit Chullasapya - actor
 Farida Waller – model and beauty pageant titleholder
 Florence Vanida Faivre – model and actress
 Gena Desouza – singer and actress
 Hugo (musician) – singer and musician
 Intira Charoenpura – actress and singer
 James Ma – actor and model
 Janie Tienphosuwan – actress and model
 Jannine Weigel – singer, actress, and model
 Jason Young (actor) – actor and singer
 Jesdaporn Pholdee – actor, model, and TV host
 Jessica Pasaphan – actress
 Jetrin Wattanasin – pop musician and actor
 Jintara Poonlarp – traditional & pop music singer
 Jirayu Tangsrisuk – actor and model
 Jocelyn Seagrave – actress
 Joey Chernyim – comedian
 Johnny Anfone – singer, actor, and TV host
 Jonas Anderson – singer
 Joni Anwar – aka Joni Raptor, pop singer and actor
 Kan Kantathavorn – TV host, actor, and model
 Kanyawee Songmuang – actress and model
 Kathaleeya McIntosh – actress and TV host
 Katreeya English – singer, actress, and model
 Kemisara Paladesh – actress and TV host
 Kesarin Chaichalermpol – pornographic actress
 Kessarin Ektawatkul – actress, and former national champion in taekwondo
 Khemanit Jamikorn – actress, model, and singer
 Khemupsorn Sirisukha – actress, model, and TV host
 Kimberley Anne Woltemas – actress and model
 Krissada Terrence – pop singer and actor
 Krystal Vee – actress
 Laila Boonyasak – actress and model
 Lalita Panyopas – actress
 Lanna Commins – singer
 Lapat Ngamchaweng – singer, actor, and model
 Lena Christensen – actress, TV host, and singer
 Leo Saussay – actor, TV host and singer
 Lisa – Thai pop singer based in South Korea, member of girl group Blackpink
 Lor Tok – comedian and actor
 Lydia Sarunrat Deane – R&B singer
 Mai Charoenpura – singer and actress
 Maria Lynn Ehren – model, beauty pageant titleholder, and pop singer
 Mario Maurer – actor and model
 Marsha Wattanapanich – pop singer and actress
 Metinee Kingpayom – model, actress, VJ, and beauty pageant titleholder
 Michael Chaturantabut – actor
 Michael Shaowanasai – artist and actor
 Michele Waagaard – model, pop singer, actress, VJ, and radio host
 Mitr Chaibancha – actor
 Monkaen Kaenkoon – singer and actor
 Morakot Sangtaweep – actress, model, TV host, and beauty pageant titleholder 
 Myra Molloy – singer and actress
 Myria Benedetti – singer, actress, and model
 Nadech Kugimiya – actor and model
 Nakadia, birth name Seephrai Mungphanklang, born 1980 – DJ and producer, currently based in Germany
 Namthip Jongrachatawiboon – actress, singer, and model
 Napakpapha Nakprasitte – actress
 Naphat Siangsomboon – actor and model
 Nat Sakdatorn – singer-songwriter, actor, and writer
 Natalie Kanyapak Phoksomboon — beauty pageant titleholder
 Nattasha Bunprachom – model and actress
 Nichaphat Chatchaipholrat – actress and model
 Nichkhun Horvejkul – Thai pop singer based in South Korea, member of boy group 2PM
 Nicole Theriault – pop singer
 Nicolene Pichapa Limsnukan – model and beauty pageant titleholder
 Nittha Jirayungyurn – actress and model
 Nonthawan Bramaz – actress, TV host, model, and beauty pageant titleholder
 Pachara Chirathivat – actor, singer, and model
 Pachrapa Chaichua – actress and model
 Pakorn Chatborirak – actor and model
 Pakorn Lum – actor and singer
 Palmy – singer
 Patcharapa Chaichua – actress and model
 Patharawarin Timkul – actress and model
 Patiparn Pataweekarn – actor and pop singer
 Paula Taylor – actress, model, and TV host
 Paweensuda Drouin – model, radio host, and beauty pageant titleholder
 Penpak Sirikul – actress and model
 Peranee Kongthai – actress and model
 Petchara Chaowarat – actress
 Petchtai Wongkamlao – comedian, actor, and film director
 Peter Corp Dyrendal – actor and model
 Phai Phongsathon – singer and actor
 Phiyada Akkraseranee – actress, model, and TV host
 Phuwaryne Keenan – actor, singer, and model
 Pisut Praesangeam – actor, film director, film producer and screenwriter
 Pitchanart Sakakorn – actress
 Pongpat Wachirabunjong – singer, actor, and film director
 Pongsak Rattanapong – singer and actor
 Porntip Nakhirunkanok – beauty pageant titleholder
 Porntip Papanai – actress and model
 Praya Lundberg – actress and model
 Preechaya Pongthananikorn – actress and model
 Prin Suparat – actor and model
 Pumpuang Duangjan – singer and actress
 Pumwaree Yodkamol – actress
 Puttichai Kasetsin – actor, DJ, and TV host
 Ranee Campen – actress and model
 Rasri Balenciaga – actress and model
 Ray MacDonald – TV host and actor
 Rhatha Phongam – actress, singer, and model
 Sadanun Balenciaga – singer, actress, and model
 Sammy Cowell – actress, model, and fashion designer
 Sara Malakul Lane – actress and model
 Savika Chaiyadej – actress
 Sinjai Plengpanich – actress, model, and TV host
 Siriyakorn Pukkavesh – actress, model, TV host, designer, and magazine publisher
 Sombat Metanee – actor and film director
 Somlek Sakdikul – actor and musician
 Songsit Roongnophakunsri — singer and actor
 Sonia Couling – model, actress, VJ for MTV Asia, and producer
 Sophida Kanchanarin – investment banking manager and beauty pageant titleholder
 Sorapong Chatree – actor
 Sorn – Thai pop singer based in South Korea, member of girl group CLC
 Sornram Teppitak – actor and pop singer
 Sririta Jensen – actress and model
 Stella Malucchi – model and actress
 Sukollawat Kanarot – actor, model, and singer
 Supaksorn Chaimongkol – model and actress
 Supakorn Kitsuwon – film and stage actor
 Sunny Suwanmethanont – actor and model
 Suthep Po-ngam – comedian, actor, film director, and screenwriter
 Suvanant Kongying – considered Thailand's most famous actress 1990–2000
 Suwinit Panjamawat – actor
 Taksaorn Paksukcharern – actress and model
 Tanit Jitnukul – film director, screenwriter and producer
 Tai Orathai – singer and actress
 Tata Young – singer and actress
 Teeradeth Wongpuapun – actor, model and TV host
 Teeradon Supapunpinyo – actor and singer
 Ten – Thai pop singer based in South Korea, member of boy groups NCT, its sub-unit WayV and SuperM
 Thanapob Leeratanakajorn – actor and singer
 Thikamporn Ritta-apinan – actress, TV host, and DJ
 Thongchai McIntyre – pop singer
 Tom Waller – film director and producer
 Tommy Hatto – actor and model
 Tony Jaa – martial artist, actor, action choreographer, stuntman, and director 
 Toon Hiranyasap – actor
 Ungsumalynn Sirapatsakmetha – actress and model
 Urassaya Sperbund – actress and model
 Utt Panichkul – actor, TV host, and model
 Vanessa Herrmann – beauty pageant titleholder 
 Violette Wautier – singer and actress
 Wan Thanakrit - singer and actor
 Warattaya Nilkuha – actress and model
 Willy McIntosh – actor and TV host
 Winai Kraibutr – actor
 Woranut Wongsawan – actress and model
 Worarat Suwannarat – actress, model, and TV host
 Worrawech Danuwong – singer and actor

Sports

 Abdulhafiz Bueraheng – professional footballer
 Adul Lahsoh – professional footballer
 Airfan Doloh – professional footballer
 Ajcharaporn Kongyot – indoor volleyball player
 Alex Albon – Formula 1 driver
 Alexander Sieghart – professional footballer
 Amanda Mildred Carr – professional BMX cyclist
 Anthony Ampaipitakwong – professional goer
 Antonio Verzura – professional footballer
 August Gustafsson Lohaprasert – professional footballer
 Chanathip Songkrasin – professional footballer
 Chanatip Sonkham – taekwondo athlete
 Charyl Chappuis – professional footballer
 Chatchu-on Moksri – indoor volleyball player
 Dennis Buschening – professional footballer
 Ernesto Amantegui Phumipha – professional footballer
 Gionata Verzura – professional footballer
 Hermann Husslein – slalom canoeist 
 Karina Krause – indoor volleyball player
 Kawin Thamsatchanan – professional footballer
 Kevin Deeromram – professional footballer
 Kissada Nilsawai – indoor volleyball player
 Malika Kanthong – indoor volleyball player
 Manuel Bihr – professional footballer
 Marco Ballini – professional footballer
 Mika Chunuonsee – professional footballer
 Muhammad Osamanmusa – futsal player
 Narissapat Lam – badminton player
 Nina Ligon – equestrian 
 Nootsara Tomkom – indoor volleyball player
 Pamorn Martdee – Muay Thai kickboxer
 Panipak Wongpattanakit – taekwondo athlete
 Patrick Aaltonen – professional footballer
 Peter Läng – professional footballer
 Philip Roller – professional footballer
 Pimpichaya Kokram – indoor volleyball player
 Pleumjit Thinkaow – indoor volleyball player
 Ratchanok Intanon – badminton player
 Samuel Cunningham (footballer) – professional footballer
 Sandy Stuvik – racing driver
 Sarach Yooyen – professional footballer
 Princess Sirivannavari – equestrian
 Sumkhan Poamsombat - footballer
 Supachai Jaided – professional footballer
 Tamarine Tanasugarn – professional tennis player
 Theerathon Bunmathan – professional footballer
 Tiffany Bias – professional basketball player
 Tristan Do – professional footballer
 Wiradech Kothny – fencer

Others

 Apirak Kosayothin – former business executive and former governor of Bangkok.
 Gigguk (Garnt Maneetapho) – YouTuber and podcaster
 Fa Poonvoralak – writer
 James Yenbamroong – entrepreneur and founder of Thailand-based space company Mu Space
 Jon Ungpakorn – non-governmental organization (NGO) executive, member of the Senate
 Lady Meriam – first wife of Tunku Abdul Rahman
 Ommi Pipit-Suksun – ballerina
 Pichaet Wiriyachitra – former university chemistry professor
 Sebastian Demanop – retired blind activist

See also
 List of Thai actresses
 List of Thai actors
 List of Thai film directors
 List of prime ministers of Thailand
 :Category:Thai royalty
 Lists of people by nationality

References